Mariusz Fyrstenberg and Santiago González were the two-time defending champions, but Fyrstenberg chose not to participate this year and González chose to compete in Buenos Aires instead.

Brian Baker and Nikola Mektić won the title, defeating Ryan Harrison and Steve Johnson in the final, 6–3, 6–4. This was the first doubles title for Baker and Mektic individually and as a pair.

Seeds

Draw

Draw

References
 Main draw

Memphis Open - Doubles
2017 Doubles